The Canon RF lens mount is an interchangeable-lens mount developed by Canon for its full-frame mirrorless interchangeable-lens cameras, and featured first by the EOS R, followed by the EOS RP. The RF mount was announced in September 2018. In May 2022, Canon announced APS-C EOS R cameras (the EOS R10 and EOS R7) and RF-S lenses designed for these cameras.

The RF mount allows for the use of Canon EF and EF-S mount lenses using one of three Canon-made lens adapters. When an RF-S or EF-S lens is attached, however, the camera will only function as an APS-C camera, not a full-frame camera.

Details
Canon full-frame cameras have used the EF lens mount since 1987. In comparison with that mount, the RF mount's inner diameter is the same at 54 mm. The RF mount's flange focal distance at 20 mm is much shorter than that of the Canon EF and EF-S mounts at 44 mm. The EF-M mount has a flange focal distance of 18 mm.

An EF-EOS R lens adapter enables Canon EF, EF-S, TS-E and MP-E lenses to be used on cameras that have the RF mount. The three adapters have differing features:
 Mount Adapter EF-EOS R
 Control Ring Mount Adapter EF-EOS R – the Mount Adapter EF-EOS R with a lens control ring
 Drop-In Filter Mount Adapter EF-EOS R – the Mount Adapter EF-EOS R with the ability to use drop-in filters, either a variable neutral density (V-ND) filter or circular polarising (C-PL) filter, and a clear (CL) filter, released in 2019.

If an EF-EOS R Mount Adapter is used to mount an EF-S lens, the image will have to be cropped by 1.6x due to the smaller image circle on EF-S lenses.

Lenses

When Canon announced its first R-series body, it announced four new RF-mount lenses:
 RF 24–105mm F4 L IS USM
 RF 28–70mm F2 L USM
 RF 50mm F1.2 L USM
 RF 35mm F1.8 MACRO IS STM — 0.5× maximum magnification.

In conjunction with the February 2019 announcement of the entry-level full-frame EOS RP, Canon announced six additional lenses would be released by the end of that year, although it did not indicate release dates for any of them:
 RF 85mm F1.2 L USM
 RF 85mm F1.2 L USM DS — Same as the above, except includes "defocus smoothing" technology intended to improve bokeh. According to Canon, the effect is similar to that of an apodization filter, but achieved through special lens coatings instead of a filter.
 RF 15–35mm F2.8 L IS USM
 RF 24–70mm F2.8 L IS USM
 RF 24–240mm F4–6.3 IS USM
 RF 70–200mm F2.8 L IS USM

In 2020, Canon introduced 7 new RF mount lenses:
 RF 24–105mm F4–7.1 IS STM
 RF 600mm F11 IS STM — fixed-aperture lens
 RF 800mm F11 IS STM — fixed-aperture lens
 RF 85mm F2 MACRO IS STM — 0.5× maximum magnification
 RF 50mm F1.8 STM
 RF 70–200mm F4 L IS USM
 RF 100–500mm F4.5–7.1 L IS USM

In 2021, Canon introduced 7 new RF mount lenses:
 RF 100mm F2.8 L MACRO IS USM - 1.4× maximum magnification
 RF 400mm F2.8 L IS USM
 RF 600mm F4 L IS USM
 RF 14–35mm F4 L IS USM
 RF 16mm F2.8 STM
 RF 100–400mm F5.6–8 IS USM
 RF 5.2mm F2.8 L Dual Fisheye 

In 2022, Canon introduced the first RF-S lenses (RF-S 18-150mm and the RF-S 18-45mm) for APS-C Sensors, together with the R7 and R10 camera bodies with the first built in APS-C Sensor in the R-System. 

In 2022, Canon introduced seven new RF mount lenses:

 RF 1200mm F8 L IS USM
 RF 800mm F5.6 L IS USM
 RF-S 18-150mm f/3.5-6.3 IS STM
 RF-S 18-45mm f/4.5-6.3 IS STM
 RF 24mm F1.8 MACRO IS STM - 0.5×maximum magnification
 RF 15–30mm F4.5–6.3 IS STM
 RF 135mm F1.8 L IS USM

RF-mount lenses are not compatible with EF, EF-S or EF-M mount camera bodies. RF-S lenses can be used on full-frame RF cameras, however, the image must be cropped by 1.6x.

Compatibility
The cameras that can use the RF mount are:
 Canon EOS R
 Canon EOS RP
 Canon EOS Ra
 Canon EOS R3
 Canon EOS R5
 Canon EOS R5 C
 Canon EOS R6
 Canon EOS R6 Mark II
 Canon EOS R7
 Canon EOS R8
 Canon EOS R10
 Canon EOS R50
 Canon EOS C70 Cinema Camera
 RED Komodo 6K

Canon RF-mount lenses

3rd party RF-mount lenses 

Note: The Samyang, Yongnuo, and Viltrox AF 85mm 1.4 do not appear to be for sale any more in U.S. markets.

Canon RF Mount Lenses Timeline

See also
 Canon EF-M lens mount
 Canon EF lens mount
 Nikon Z-mount
 Sony E-mount

References

External links 

Canon RF lenses
Lens mounts